Amydria obliquella is a moth of the family Acrolophidae. It is found in North America, including Arizona, California, Manitoba, Maryland, New Mexico, Saskatchewan and Texas.

References

Moths described in 1905
Acrolophidae